Sint-Kruis-Winkel is a sub-municipality of Ghent, Belgium.

External links

Sub-municipalities of Ghent
Populated places in East Flanders